The CIT Paraguay Open was a tournament for professional female tennis players played on outdoor clay courts. The event was classified as a $50,000 ITF Women's Circuit tournament and was first and only held in Asunción, Paraguay, in 2014.

Past finals

Singles

Doubles

External links 
 Official website 
 ITF search

ITF Women's World Tennis Tour
Clay court tennis tournaments
Tennis tournaments in Paraguay
Recurring sporting events established in 2014
Recurring sporting events disestablished in 2014
Defunct sports competitions in Paraguay